The 2013 Grand-Am of The Americas presented by Gainsco and Total was held on March 2, 2013 as the second race of 2013 Rolex Sports Car Series season, and the first Grand-Am race at the Circuit of the Americas.

Entry list

Qualifying 

The qualifying session will take place on March 1. The DP session will commence at 17:15 EST and will last for 15 minutes. GT and GX will qualify between 17:40 and 17:55 EST.

References 

Grand-Am of the Americas
Grand-Am of the Americas
Grand-Am of the Americas
Motorsport competitions in Texas
Sports in Austin, Texas